The Kasai River (called Cassai in Angola) is a left bank tributary of the Congo River, located in Central Africa. The river begins in central Angola and flows to the east until it reaches the border between Angola and the Democratic Republic of the Congo, where it turns north and serves as the border until it flows into the DRC. From Ilebo, between the confluences with Lulua river and Sankuru river, the Kasai river turns to a westerly direction. The lower stretch of the river from the confluence with Fimi river, is known as the Kwa(h) River, before it joins the Congo at Kwamouth northeast of Kinshasa. The Kasai basin consists mainly of equatorial rainforest areas, which provide an agricultural land in a region noted for its infertile, sandy soil. It is a tributary of Congo river and diamonds are found in it. Around 60% of diamonds in Belgium go from Kasai river for cutting and shaping.

Exploration
Henry Morton Stanley reached the confluence on 9 March 1877, calling the river Nkutu, a "powerful and deep river", but recognizing it as originating from David Livingstone's Kwango.

Tributaries
The Kasai's main tributaries upstream from the confluence with the Congo:
 Fimi (Fimi-Lukenie length 1100 km, basin size 132 000 km2, mean annual discharge ~ 2000 m3/s)
 Kwilu/Kwango (1800 km, 263 500 km2, 3299 m3/s)
 Loange
 Sankuru (1200 km, 156 000 km2, 2500 m3/s) 
 Lulua

Economic importance
The tributaries of River Kasai are clear of obstacles like cataracts and river weed, making them very navigable. They facilitate the transport sector and form an important trade artery. The river's role in transport and trade was more prominent during the pre-colonial period when the slave trade was legal. Slave traders used one of its major tributaries, the Kwango River, to navigate the equatorial rain forest, capture slaves and find their way back to the Atlantic Ocean where they had docked their ships.
It is greatly controversial that some of the local kingdoms that were along the Kasai River supported the slave trade. The Rund kingdom for instance, readily provided slaves for the most notorious slave traders like John Matthews, a renowned British slave vendor.  These activities, though they occurred between the 18th and 19th centuries, left a lasting impact in the regions where they were most prominent, such as between the Kwango and the Kwilu rivers. The population has never recovered fully, with the population density lower than that of areas that did not experience the slave trade.
The most probable trigger to British and Portuguese great interests in the Kasai River was the presence of alluvial diamonds lying in rich deposit beds, especially at the river's mouth. More deposits lie along the beds of a major tributary, the Kwango River. In fact, it is common to hear the phrase “the diamond heartland of North Eastern Angola” used in reference to the Kwango River valley. This is because the diamond alluvial beds found in this region are the richest in Angola.

See also 
 Kasai River disaster

References

External links 
 Map of the Kasai River basin at Water Resources eAtlas

 
Rivers of Angola
Rivers of the Democratic Republic of the Congo
Ecoregions of the Democratic Republic of the Congo
International rivers of Africa
Border rivers
Tributaries of the Congo River
Angola–Democratic Republic of the Congo border